Michael Arnowitt (born in Boston, Massachusetts) is an American classical and jazz pianist and political activist.  He briefly attended Yale University before graduating from Goddard College.  Arnowitt lived in Montpelier, Vermont for 32 years and, since 2017, divides his time between there and Toronto, Ontario.  A documentary film about his life, Beyond 88 Keys: The Music of Michael Arnowitt (directed by Susan Bettmann), premiered at the 2004 Green Mountain Film Festival and was awarded the 2004 Goldstone Award by the Vermont Film Commission. Arnowitt is vision-impaired due to retinitis pigmentosa.

References

External links
 Official website
 "Michael Arnowitt: A Pianist Worthy of Greater Notice" (Classical Voice of New England 2008)
 Beyond 88 Keys: The Music of Michael Arnowitt (The Battle of White Plains Theater)
 2018 jazz album Sweet Spontaneous

American classical pianists
American male pianists
Blind classical musicians
Living people
People from Montpelier, Vermont
21st-century classical pianists
21st-century American male musicians
Year of birth missing (living people)
Musicians from Boston
21st-century American pianists